Stegastes adustus, also known as the dusky damselfish or scarlet-backed demoiselle, is a species of damselfish in the family Pomacentridae. It is found at one-  to three-meter depths on surging and wavy coral reefs in the Caribbean Sea, the tropical waters of the western Atlantic Ocean, and the Gulf of Mexico.

Feeding
Adults feed on algae, plants, and detritus. S. adustus  exhibits different feeding behaviors between those that live in coral rubble and patch reef habitats.

References

External links
http://www.fishbase.us/TrophicEco/DietCompoList.php?ID=12416
 

adustus
Fish described in 1855
Fish of the Atlantic Ocean